Unital may refer to:
 A unital algebra – an algebra that contains a multiplicative identity element.
 A geometric unital – a  block design for integer .
 A unital algebraic structure, such as a unital magma.
 A unital map on C*-algebras – a map that preserves the identity element.